Carrai is a national park located in New South Wales, Australia,  north of Sydney. Not far from the north coast of New South Wales, located on a granite plateau, lies Carrai National Park. Surrounded and protected by vast areas of eucalyptus and subtropical rainforests, stands the Carrai plateau with steep slopes that dramatically descend to the Kunderang stream and the Macleay river.

See also
 Protected areas of New South Wales

References

National parks of New South Wales
Protected areas established in 1999
1999 establishments in Australia